Sokcho (()) is a city in Gangwon Province, South Korea. It is located in the far northeast of Gangwon. This city is a major tourist hub, and a popular gateway to nearby Seoraksan national park. Sokcho is home to the lakes: Yeongrangho and Cheongchoho that are naturally created by the Sea of Japan It was under DPRK control from 1945 to 1950, but on August 18, 1951, the South Korean army captured it.

History 
Sokcho originally was a part of Dongye from roughly 3rd-century BC to around early 5th-century. Sokcho started from just a fishing village with a few people around Cheongchoho. In 1905, it became one of the major ports because of its geological feature. Since Cheongchoho lake is adjacent to the Sea of Japan, big ships were able to come in and out with ease. Later on, Sokcho, linked with Seoul by air and road, the city became a mineral transfer port in 1937. Upon the division of the Korean peninsula into two countries following World War II, Sokcho was on the North Korean side of the border, but since the Korean War armistice (1953), it has been a part of South Korea.

Tourism

Seoraksan National Park is located in the vicinity of Sokcho and attracts many domestic and international tourists. The city itself is known for the beach, natural hot springs, and golf courses, as well as fine fishery products.

The nearby Yeongrangho lake is renowned for its beauty. The reflection of Seoraksan and its Ulsanbawi are particularly popular. There are a number of well-preserved Buddhist temples in the area around Sokcho. The main building of the Sinheungsa temple (Geukrakbojeon) is a major tourist destination (originally built in the 15th century). Also notable is the Hyangseongsaji samcheung seoktap, a three-storey pagoda of 4.3 metres. It dates from 652 and is located at the site of the Hyangseongsa temple.

Yeonggeumjeong, a pavilion built on the shores of Sokcho, is popular for its magnificent views of the sunrise, as well as for hearing the sound of the sea. It is thought that the pavilion was built at this location for sonic reasons.

Marina Yacht is located in Cheongchoho Lake Park and it provides a yacht tour on a wide expanse of the Sea of Japan. The yacht sailing begins and ends at Cheongcho Marina passing Seorakdaegyo Bridge, Dongmyeonghang Port, Jodo in order. Marina Yacht rents boats to people who have a boat driving license. The place also operates a café.

Yeongrangho Hwarangdo Experience Center is held various experience programs, horse riding members recruitment, and annual World Knight Championship. The center contributes to the transmission of traditional horseback martial art and popularization, and vitalization of horse riding.

Abai village near Seoraksan was originally set up as an area to house North Korean refugees in Sokcho due to the separation of the two Koreas. Consequently, many of the population have relatives in North Korea. The village has seen increased tourism due to the popularity of the Korean Drama Autumn in My Heart on KBS.

In July 2016, Sokcho became one of the few locations in South Korea where Pokémon Go could be played due to government restrictions on mapping data. Players flocked to the city, causing bus tickets to sell out.

In 1999, Gangwon International Tourism Expo was held.

Today, a number of tourists are also attracted by the closeness to the DMZ.

Sokcho used to have its own airport, linking the city to Seoul. Currently, the city is served by the Yangyang International Airport.

The opening of KTX Kyung Kang line has made it convenient for travelers to visit Gangwon-Do province which is only an 86-minute train ride that starts from Seoul and tons of attractions.

Daepo harbor is a port located in Daepo-dong, Sokcho. Mt. Seorak and the East Coast (of South Korea) turn into tourist attractions rather than national professional fishing port, Daepo harbor against tourists began to serve as destinations. Sokcho City offers various attractions such as sea fountain and beach cable car at Daepo harbor.

Food 
Sockho's traditional market is full of things to see, buy, and eat. Formed in 1953 as the Sokcho Tourist & Fishery Market, it was included on the Korea Tourism Organization's list of “Best Traditional Markets for Foreign Tourists” last year. With fresh fish caught off the coast in the Sea of Japan to dried fish and various vegetables, one can have fun just looking around and watching the fishmongers bargaining with local market goers.

Sokcho is known for Hoe, which is a raw fish. The coastal waters provide good fishing grounds for Ojingeo, Myeongtae, Gwangeo and Godeungeo.

Sundubu can be found in the streets of the tofu towns such as Sinheung Sundubu and Haksapyeong Sundubu - it is made from Seoraksan and Sea of Japan water.

Sokcho offers a unique twist to Sundae (not the eponymous dessert) by using Ojingeo instead of pork intestines. The Ojingeo-sundae consists of squid stir-fry, made with noodles and blood sausage, with carrots, onions, seaweed and spices mixed together, covered with thin fried egg yolk.

Culture
Local cuisine can be experienced in the various food districts of the city. "Foodtown" is a two block area dedicated to restaurants where visitors can find mainly Korean style beef pork and chicken restaurants. Daepo harbor, outside of Sokcho on the road to Yangyang offers more than 100 individual mini restaurants serving diverse seafood dishes. An own unique stuffed squid dish, Abai Sundae, can be found in Abai village.

In October Sokcho comes to life with the Seorak Cultural Festival, which includes parades, stage shows, contests, races and various other forms of entertainment. The rice cake making sampling contests are particularly popular.  Another unusual event is the Gaet-Bae, or raft, race.  Two teams propel the rafts across the course by pulling on long handled hooks catching the cable that straddles the deck of each raft.

Climate

Sokcho straddles the line between a humid subtropical climate (Köppen: Cfa) and a humid continental climate (Köppen: Dfa).

Sister cities
  Jeongeup, North Jeolla since June 13, 1996
  Jung-gu, Seoul since January 22, 1997
  Gresham, Oregon, United States since June 23, 1985
  Taitung County, Taiwan since April 16, 1992
  Hunchun, Jilin, People's Republic of China since August 22, 1994
  Yonago, Tottori, Japan since October 18, 1995
  Khasansky, Primorsky Krai, Russia since July 19, 1996
  Nyūzen, Toyama, Japan since October 3, 1996
  Sakaiminato, Tottori, Japan since April 9, 2002
  Partizansk, Primorsky Krai, Russia

Gallery

Notable people from Sokcho 

 Shin Ye-eun (Hangul: 신예은), a South Korean actress
 Park Kwang-su (Hangul: 박광수), a South Korean filmmaker 
 Hwang Keum-chan (Hangul: 황금찬), a poet born in Sokcho, Gangwon-do
 Kim Kang-min (Hangul: 김강민), a South Korean actor under the label of Mystic Story
 Monday (birth name: Kim Ji-min, Hangul:김지민 ), singer, dancer, rapper and K-pop idol, member of K-pop girlgroup Weeekly

See also
 Seorak Cultural Festival
 List of cities in South Korea
 Dae Jo Yeong (TV series)

References

External links

 Sokcho city government English-language home page
 Sokcho-si :Official Site of Korea Tourism Org

 
Cities in Gangwon Province, South Korea
Port cities and towns in South Korea